The 152nd General Assembly of the U.S. state of Georgia convened its first session on January 14, 2013, at the Georgia State Capitol in Atlanta.  The 152nd Georgia General Assembly succeeded the 151st and preceded the 153rd.

Party composition

Senate

House of Representatives

Officers

Senate

Majority leadership

Minority leadership

House of Representatives

Majority leadership

Minority leadership

Members of the State Senate

Changes in Membership from Previous Term

Changes in Membership During Current Term
Barry Loudermilk resigned from the Georgia Senate, representing the 14th district, in August 2013, to focus on his campaign for a seat in the United States House of Representatives. Bruce Thompson won a special election to fill the remainder of his term.

Announced Retirements

Members of the House of Representatives

Changes in Membership from Previous Term

Changes in Membership During Current Term

References

External links
Georgia General Assembly website
2013–2015 Representatives by Name
2013–2015 Senators by Name

Georgia (U.S. state) legislative sessions
2013 in Georgia (U.S. state)
2014 in Georgia (U.S. state)